Royal Australian Naval Volunteer Reserve (RANVR) was a reserve force of the Royal Australian Navy.

Formation

In late 1920, the Navy Board proposed the creation of an Royal Australian Naval Volunteer Reserve scheme, with approaches made to yachting and rowing clubs, starting in New South Wales, South Australia, Victoria, and Tasmania.  Men who were undergoing or liable to compulsory training under the Defence Act (Cwlth) were ineligible for enrolment.  For the volunteers, a period of five years of service was proposed with parading twice a month, training occur outside of business hours, entry as an able seaman rating, and officer appointments not based on social or other positions.  Requirements later included fourteen days training every alternate year, and 'seven days out of this period should be spent afloat'.

By 1925, following mufti attire on parades, the uniform was determined to be the same as the regular forces, with 'RANVR' replacing 'RANR' on the cap band, and the uniform to be supplied by the government instead of the individual as had been the case in the past.  Members, unless former ratings of the Royal Navy or Royal Australian Navy, had to be more than 21 years-of-age.

World War II actions

During World War II, most Australian coastwatchers were commissioned as officers in the RANVR.  Some RANVR officers also served in the Royal Navy, and with the Royal Canadian Navy.  One officer also served as the Royal Navy liaison officer to the Soviet Navy.

 was a fishing trawler requisitioned by the Royal Navy in 1940 and converted for anti-submarine warfare.

She was commanded by Acting Lieutenant Commander Maurice George Rose, RANVR from 2 May 1941 to 1 May 1943, succeeded by Lieutenant George Lanning, RANVR until 11 June 1945. She was part of Escort Group B7, one of seven such British naval groups which served with the Mid-Ocean Escort Force (MOEF). It provided convoy protection in the most dangerous midsection of the North Atlantic route.

In June 1945, the starting contingent of 12 RAAF pilots were transferred to the RANVR, to undergo training and service with the Fleet Air Arm of the Royal Navy.

It was confirmed members could receive promotion in exceptional circumstances if they had the special qualifications.  Members demobilising at the end of the war were entitled to a discharge certificate.

1946–1973

In August 1948, with just 948 members on Royal Australian Navy's reserve list, the RANVR was reestablished, seeking 30000 former reservists with wartime service rejoin for a four-year term.  By December, 1300 former navy members had applied.  Youth and men with no naval experience would be sought later. The Women's Royal Australian Naval Reserve was also created.  RANVR personnel were different to the Royal Australian Naval Reserve. The former could be called up for hostilities, whereas the latter group could be mobilised at any time. The minimum recruiting age was seventeen years.

With the onset of the Korean War in 1950, those persons unable to join the Royal Australian Naval Reserve due to an inability to perform training or distance were able to be accepted into the RANVR.  A submission was also made at this time to have all service payments to members tax-free.  Reservists continued to be used in various capacities such as additional staffing for the 1962 Exercise Seascape, part of a South-East Asia Treaty Organisation operation.

The current Royal Australian Naval Reserve was formed in June 1973, from a merger of the RANVR and the RANR (Seagoing), formed in 1921 and 1913 respectively.

Individual honours

Various members of the RANVR received acknowledgement for their service.  By May 1944, fifty-six RANVR personnel had received 71 decorations or awards; and by August 1944, RANVR personnel had been included two George Crosses, two DSOs, two OBEs, two MBEs, sixteen DSCs, one Conspicuous Gallantry Medal, two DSMs, and ten George Medals.  Due to wartime security, the reasons for the awards were not always released at the time of awarding.

A person's presence in the below list does not suggest their award was more notable than any other award; ranks and existing citations are as of the time of the awarding; and the list is incomplete.  Person may be listed for more than one entry.  List ranked by 'order of wear'.

References

External links
 

Military units and formations of Australia in World War II
History of the Royal Australian Navy
Military units and formations established in 1921
1921 establishments in Australia
Military units and formations disestablished in 1973
1973 disestablishments in Australia